The Morgridge Institute for Research is a private, nonprofit biomedical research institute in Madison, Wis., affiliated with the University of Wisconsin–Madison. The institute works to improve human health by conducting, enabling and translating interdisciplinary biomedical research. Research in regenerative biology, virology, medical devices and core computational technology is currently underway.

The institute is housed in the Wisconsin Institutes for Discovery building, which was made possible with a $50 million gift from Tashia and John Morgridge as well as support from the Wisconsin Alumni Research Foundation and the state of Wisconsin.

The interdisciplinary science at the Morgridge Institute is funded by the National Institutes of Health, U.S. Department of Energy, U.S. Department of Homeland Security and other public and private sources. Relationships with industry and private investors leverage this funding to speed the commercial development of research results.

The Morgridge Institute for Research is one of three entities occupying the $150 million Wisconsin Institutes for Discovery building; the other entities include a public research enterprise known as the Wisconsin Institute for Discovery and the Town Center, which functions to encourage interaction among scientists and community members and hosts events and educational programs. The entire project received gold certification in 2011 under the Leadership in Energy and Environmental Design program and is expected to use 50 percent less energy and water than a typical laboratory.

History
Conceived by the Morgridges in 2005 to provide greater flexibility to scientists working in interdisciplinary fields such as regenerative biology, the project attracted matching funds from the state of Wisconsin and the Wisconsin Alumni Research Foundation, the patent and licensing organization for UW–Madison.

The Morgridges' gift, announced in April 2006, represented the single largest private donation in university history. A former CEO and chairman of Cisco Systems, John Morgridge and wife Tashia, a retired special education teacher, met in high school in Wauwatosa and graduated from UW–Madison in 1955.

Previous philanthropic gifts by the Morgridges to UW–Madison included a 2004 gift of $31 million to renovate and modernize the Education Building, as well as gifts to the School of Business and the College of Engineering. Their vision for the Morgridge Institute for Research included development of educational programs that would allow the public to engage with scientific topics such as human embryonic stem cells.

The Morgridge Institute allows university faculty to hold dual appointments in both traditional academic settings and the private center.

Scientific Leadership
Research activities at the Morgridge Institute are driven by the work of scientific leaders in regenerative biology; virology; and medical devices. These challenge areas build on core research strengths at UW–Madison and are supported by the university's expertise in high throughput computing. The scientific challenge areas were chosen for their potential to advance basic science and their promise of delivering new technologies to improve human health.

Researchers leading the challenge areas and programs at the Morgridge Institute for Research include:

	James Thomson, director of regenerative biology. Thomson, the first to derive human embryonic stem cells in 1998, directs regenerative biology at the Morgridge Institute for Research. His current research focuses on cellular reprogramming and techniques to optimize differentiation. Thomson holds a joint appointment as an anatomy professor at UW-Madison's School of Medicine and Public Health.
	Paul Ahlquist, lead scientist in virology. In addition to leading the virology program, Ahlquist holds appointments as a Howard Hughes Medical Investigator, and as a UW–Madison professor of oncology at the School of Medicine and Public Health, molecular virology in the Graduate School and plant pathology in the College of Agricultural and Life Sciences. His current work focuses on improving understanding, prevention and treatment of viruses and their diseases.
	Thomas Rockwell Mackie, director of medical devices, is a UW–Madison professor of medical physics and human oncology at the School of Medicine and Public Health and nuclear, engineering physics and biomedical engineering in the College of Engineering. Mackie's work focuses on translational research including better ways to move potential new medical devices through regulatory approval and more effectively treat patients.
 Miron Livny, chief technology officer and director of core computational technology. Livny, a UW–Madison professor of computer sciences in the College of Letters and Science and director of UW–Madison's Center for High Throughput Computing, leads core computational technology including development of advanced computing infrastructure. Livny, creator of the Condor High-Throughput Computing System, serves both the Morgridge Institute for Research and the Wisconsin Institute for Discovery.

Construction
The Morgridge Institute for Research opened in December 2010 and is housed in the Wisconsin Institutes for Discovery, a  building that is the first UW–Madison research facility to achieve LEED gold certification for green building practices. The project surpassed its initial goals for recycling 80 percent of construction waste by processing 92 percent of the demolition and excess construction materials for reuse.

A terra cotta tile system covering the building's exterior uses the clay stone's natural airtight properties to resist heat and moisture. Behind the  clay tiles, which are supported on aluminum framing, a mineral fiber insulating membrane made from 90 percent recycled material provides additional buffering from heat and cold.

Other environmentally friendly features of the Wisconsin Institutes for Discovery include a geothermal well system, solar hot-water heating, gray water use for irrigation and the use of high efficiency lighting, water flow fixtures and HVAC systems throughout. The facility is designed by Ballinger and Uihlein Wilson Architects and constructed by Findorff Mortenson Building residents, visitors to the Town Center and remote observers will be able to view real-time energy use and performance metrics for the building via their computers, public monitors and the institutes' website.

References

External links
 

University of Wisconsin–Madison